Peth Umri is a city and a municipal council in Nanded district in the Indian state of Maharashtra.

Demographics 

According to the 2001 Census of India, Peth Umri had a population of 11,151. Males constitute 52% of the population and females 48%. Peth Umri has an average literacy rate of 66%, higher than the national average of 59.5%: male literacy is 76%, and female literacy is 55%. In Peth Umri, 15% of the population is under 6 years of age.

References

Cities and towns in Nanded district